Bulls vs. Blazers and the NBA Playoffs, later released in Japan as NBA Pro Basketball: Bulls vs Blazers and the NBA Playoffs, is a 1993 basketball video game produced by Don Traeger and developed by Electronic Arts and released for the Super Nintendo Entertainment System. A later Mega Drive version was released under the title Bulls versus Blazers and the NBA Playoffs, later released in Japan as NBA Playoffs: Bulls vs Blazers.

The game is the sequel to Bulls vs Lakers and the NBA Playoffs. Like its predecessor, the game's title refers to the previous season's NBA championship series, the 1992 NBA Finals match-up between the Chicago Bulls and Portland Trail Blazers.

This game was inspired by the rivalry of two of the best in the league with Clyde Drexler and Michael Jordan as the bulls look to three-peat.

It is the first EA basketball game to feature in-game advertisements featuring the company's "EA Sports" logo.

Gameplay 
The game can be played in various ways: players can play against each other, or against the computer. Games against the computer were divided into two modes, "Exhibition" or "Playoffs". Players can pick from one of the 16 teams that had competed in the 1992 NBA Playoffs. Games can be configured for 2, 5, 8 or 12 minute quarters.

The game was the first NBA game to feature the entire rosters of each NBA Franchise at the time, including the recent expansion teams of Minnesota, Orlando, Miami, and Charlotte, as well as the full rosters of both All Star teams from the 1992 NBA All-Star Game.

The game is also notable for being the last in EA's Playoffs series to feature Charles Barkley, as he began holding out on signing a licensing agreement due to the lack of pay to retired players from the National Basketball Players Association the following year.

Marquee Shots 
Each team featured a star player with a signature move known as a "Marquee Shot". These shots were difficult to perform, and only occurred when a player would press the "A" button under the right circumstances. A list of each player's "Marquee Shot" was posted in the instruction manual, and some fan favorites included: Michael Jordan's "Free-Throw Line" dunk, Larry Bird's "Turn-Around" Fadeaway Jumper, Magic Johnson's "Fake No-Look Pass" Lay Up, Tim Hardaway's "UTEP Two-step" Killer Crossover, Shawn Kemp's "Off-the-Glass" Back-Jam, Larry Nance's "Around the World" Slam, Mookie Blaylock's "Spinning 360" Layup, Billy Owens' "Alley Oop Tomahawk" Jam, and Karl Malone's "Special Delivery In-Your-Face" Slam Dunk.

Teams 

Eastern Conference:
 Boston Celtics
 New Jersey Nets
 New York Knicks
 Philadelphia 76ers
 Chicago Bulls
 Cleveland Cavaliers
 Detroit Pistons
 Indiana Pacers
 Milwaukee Bucks
 Atlanta Hawks
 Washington Bullets
 Miami Heat
 Orlando Magic

Western Conference:
 Charlotte Hornets
 Minnesota Timberwolves
 Denver Nuggets
 Dallas Mavericks
 Houston Rockets
 Utah Jazz
 Phoenix Suns
 Seattle SuperSonics
 Los Angeles Lakers
 Los Angeles Clippers
 Golden State Warriors
 Sacramento Kings
 San Antonio Spurs
 Portland Trail Blazers

Reception

Super Gamer reviewed the SNES version and gave an overall score of 79% writing: "A comprehensive Basketball sim with great FX and music. Unfortunately, it runs too slowly." In 2018, Complex placed the game 95th on their "The Best Super Nintendo Games of All Time".

References

External links
 

1992 video games
Chicago Bulls
Electronic Arts games
National Basketball Association video games
Portland Trail Blazers
Sega Genesis games
Super Nintendo Entertainment System games
Multiplayer and single-player video games
Video games developed in the United States